Yuko may refer to:

 Yuko (judo) (yūkō), a score in judo competition
  Yuko (Ukrainian band), a Ukrainian band
 Yūko, a Japanese female given name (including a list of persons with the name)
 Yuko, a Belgian band
 Yuko people, an Amerindian ethnic group

See also
Yukou (Japanese citrus)